Cybernetics is a transdisciplinary approach for exploring regulatory systems, their structures, constraints, and possibilities, but has other definitions.

Cybernetics may also refer to:

Cybernetics: Or Control and Communication in the Animal and the Machine, a 1948 book by Norbert Wiener
Cybernetics and Human Knowing, a quarterly peer-reviewed academic journal
Cybernetics and Systems, formerly Journal of Cybernetics, a peer-reviewed scientific journal
 Cybernetics Society, a British society for the promotion of cybernetics

See also
 
 
 
 Second-order cybernetics, the cybernetics of cybernetics
 Cyberneticist
 Cyber (disambiguation)
 Cybersex
 Cyberwarfare
 Cyborg (disambiguation)
 Body hacking
 Computer security
 Neurocybernetics
 Prosthesis
 Robotics
 Sociocybernetics